Amod Yadav (born 10 December 2001) is an Indian cricketer. He made his first-class debut on 27 January 2020, for Bihar in the 2019–20 Ranji Trophy. He made his Twenty20 debut on 11 January 2021, for Bihar in the 2020–21 Syed Mushtaq Ali Trophy. He made his List A debut on 9 December 2021, for Bihar in the 2021–22 Vijay Hazare Trophy.

References

External links
 

2001 births
Living people
Indian cricketers
Bihar cricketers
Place of birth missing (living people)